Metzgeria is a genus of sea snails, marine gastropod mollusks in the family Ptychatractidae.

Species
Species within the genus Metzgeria include:

 Metzgeria alba (Jeffreys in Wyville-Thomson, 1873)
 Metzgeria californica Dall, 1903
 Metzgeria costata (Dall, 1890)
 Metzgeria gagei Bouchet & Warén, 1985
 Metzgeria montereyana Smith & Gordon, 1948
 Metzgeria problematica (Ponder, 1968)

References

Ptychatractidae